Polam Pol  is a 2016 Gujarati comedy film directed by Tejas Padiaa. Presented by Lemon Grass Productions and produced by Gopal Dave, Sangeeta Milan Shah, Jatin Doshi and Nimesh Shah. The film is a comedy drama. The film stars Jimit Trivedi, Ojas Rawal, Jinal Belanil, Prem Gadhavi, Jayesh More, Sunil Vishrani & Sanat Vyas. The film releases on 12 February 2016.

Cast
 Jimit Trivedi as Darshan (Duggi)
 Ojas Rawal as Manish (Montu)
 Jinal Belani as Anjali
 Jayesh More as Mangilal
 Prem Gadhavi as Bhikulal
 Sunil Vishrani
 Sanat Vyas

Soundtrack 
Polam Pol features songs sung by Farhad Bhiwandiwala, Nakash Aziz, Palak Muchhal, Shree Dayal, Ash King. Music and Background Score for the film is composed by Paresh-Bhavesh. The soundtrack was launched on 19 January.

Release 
The official poster for the film was released on 4 January 2016. The first trailer was released online on 11 January 2016 and was received positively by the audience.

References

External links 
 

2016 films
Indian comedy films
Films set in Ahmedabad
Films shot in Ahmedabad
Films shot in Gujarat
2010s Gujarati-language films
2016 comedy films